The Negros Occidental Provincial Board is the Sangguniang Panlalawigan (provincial legislature) of the Philippine province of Negros Occidental.

The members are elected via six provincial board districts, coextensive with the legislative districts of Negros Occidental, each sending two members to the provincial board; the electorate votes for two members, with the two candidates with the highest number of votes being elected. The Vice Governor of Negros Occidental is the ex officio presiding officer, elected with the Governor. As ex officio presiding officer, he only votes to break ties.

List of members
An additional three ex officio members are the presidents of the provincial chapters of the Association of Barangay Captains, the Councilors' League, the Sangguniang Kabataan
provincial president; the municipal and city (if applicable) presidents
of the Association of Barangay Captains, Councilor's League and Sangguniang Kabataan, shall elect amongst themselves their provincial presidents which shall be their representatives at the board.

Current members 
These are the members after the 2022 local elections and 2018 barangay and SK elections:

 Vice Governor: Jeffrey P. Ferrer (NUP)

Past members

Vice Governors

1st District Board Members
City: Escalante, San Carlos City
Municipalities: Calatrava, Salvador Benedicto, Toboso
Population (2015): 375,006

2nd District Board Members
City: Cadiz, Sagay City
Municipality: Manapla 
Population (2015): 355,832

3rd District Board Members
City: Silay City, Talisay City, Victorias City
Municipalities: Enrique B. Magalona, Murcia
Population (2015): 461,284

4th District Board Members
City: Bago, La Carlota City
Municipalities: Pontevedra, Pulupandan, San Enrique, Valladolid
Population (2015): 376,791

5th District Board Members
City: Himamaylan City
Municipalities: Binalbagan, Hinigaran, Isabela, La Castellana, Moises Padilla
Population (2015): 438,139

6th District Board Members
City: Kabankalan City, Sipalay City
Municipalities: Candoni, Cauayan, Hinoba-an, Ilog
Population (2015): 490,209

Philippine Councilors League President 
These are members representing a group of elected councilors from the twelve City Councils and nineteen Municipal Councils of Negros Occidental.

Liga ng mga Barangay President 
These are members representing a group of elected barangay chairpersons from 31 ABC councils of Negros Occidental.

Sangguniang Kabataan Federation President 
These are members representing a group of elected SK chairpersons from 31 SK Federation councils of Negros Occidental.

See also
 Negros Oriental Provincial Board

References

Provincial boards in the Philippines
Politics of Negros Occidental